Fast Foodies is an American reality television series that premiered on TruTV on February 4, 2021. The series features chefs Jeremy Ford (winner of Top Chef: California), Kristen Kish (winner of Top Chef: Seattle),  and Justin Sutherland (winner of an Iron Chef America episode, participant on Top Chef: Kentucky) as they attempt to re-create a celebrity guest's favorite fast food item and later make their own take on it. In May 2021, the series was renewed for a second season.

Background 

The idea was conceived by Shed Media producer Beau Delmore. TruTV announced the ordering of 10 episodes in October 2020. It is produced by Shed Media with Michael Rucker as an executive producer and showrunner. Julie Golden, and Shed Media's Dan Peirson and Lisa Shannon also serve as executive producers. Rucker says that the show is based on a "dirty secret of fine dining", that the chefs themselves usually just make something fast at the end of their service period when it comes to eating. Rucker also said “We didn’t want a tired series that felt one-note but something that reflected the real world, the amazing spectrum of voices in the culinary world, and was the type of kitchen that you’d actually want to hang out in.”
Rucker also said that fast food typically has a memory around it, whether it be childhood nostalgia or a guilty pleasure.

The show was filmed at chef Melissa Perello's former restaurant M. Georgina in Downtown Los Angeles, California. Ford said that he got the call in 2020 after some of the restrictions from the COVID-19 pandemic were lifted.

On May 19, 2021, TruTV renewed the series for a second season. It premiered on January 27, 2022.

Format
The three chefs meet a celebrity guest and are presented with that guest's favorite fast food dish.

In the first challenge, called the "copycat round", they have to replicate the dish, during which the guest interacts with the chefs and even helps prepare parts of the dish. The guest and the chefs try out each dish and the guest then picks which one is the most similar to the dish.

In the second challenge, called the "remix round", the chefs make their own take on the dish, doing something completely different from the original. The winner of the first challenge gives the other two chefs a minor "handicap", such as having to use some unintended ingredient. No time limits are imposed on the challenges.

They try out the new dishes and the guest picks a winner, who takes home the "Chompionship trophy" and some memorabilia. The losing chefs then have to take a minor punishment such as eating some nasty mix of ingredients or getting food thrown on them.

Broadcast 
The show premiered on TruTV on February 4, 2021. It ran on Thursdays after episodes of the ninth season of Impractical Jokers. It was also released on HBO Max in Late September 2021.

Episodes

Series overview

Season 1 (2021)

Season 2 (2022)

Reception 
Zach Johnston of Uproxx liked that Fast Foodies did not have the high pressure of the cooking competitions of other reality shows: "A win isn’t going to make some upstart chef’s career or get them a corporate catering gig. The show’s highest ambition is for you to say, 'That looks tasty! And everyone is having so much fun!' "  He also wrote that the show "does a great job feeling representative of our diverse nation. Everyone making the show obviously cares about unique voices and experiences, and they prove that in the simplest and most straightforward way possible: by reflecting it through the people appearing on screen." Andy Dehnart of the website Reality Blurred gave the show a B+, saying that it "is fun while it happens and kind of forgettable once it’s over. It resembles its cuisine: rich and enjoyable to consume, with some nutrition and a lot of unctuous filler."

Notes

References

External links 
 
 

Food reality television series
2020s American comedy television series
2020s American cooking television series
2020s American reality television series
2021 American television series debuts
TruTV original programming
Television shows filmed in Los Angeles
English-language television shows
Fast food
Television series by Warner Bros. Television Studios